"Danke" is a German Christian hymn written by Martin Gotthard Schneider in 1961. It was one of the first songs in the genre later called Neues Geistliches Lied (new spiritual song). The song title was disambiguated to its first line, "Danke für diesen guten Morgen" (Thanks for this good morning). The song has been included in the hymnal Evangelisches Gesangbuch. It has been called the best-known German sacred song.

History 
Lyrics and music of the song were written by Martin Gotthard Schneider for a competition of the Evangelische Akademie Tutzing for new sacred songs, requesting melodies in the style of jazz or pop. The song won the first prize. It was first produced in an arrangement by Werner Last with a single female singer of the Botho-Lucas-Chor in playback, but labelled the choir on the cover. Ralf Bendix performed the song in 1963 on the Kirchentag in Dortmund for an audience of 16,000. The song then made it to the charts and stayed for six weeks.

Theme 
Danke is in six stanzas of four lines each, three of them beginning with "Danke", continued by specific things for which to be grateful. Towards the end is the addressee of the thanks named as "mein Herr" ("my Lord"), thanked then for the ability to say thanks. The listing of the varied items for which to be grateful is rhetorically an "“, showing at the same time a catalogue of things, and the virtuosity of the author to assemble the catalogue.

Reception 
When first released, the song was met with protest, with some protesters calling it "Negermusik" (negro music) and "Gotteslästerung" (blasphemy); a critic in the weekly Die Zeit wrote of two sins, "eine gegen die Musik und eine gegen die Religion!" (one against music and one against religion).  Sales for the single rose to 700,000 by the late 1960s. The song has been translated into more than 25 languages. It has even been performed by groups and singers who are not affiliated with churches, such as Die Ärzte, Normahl and Mickie Krause.

"Danke für diesen guten Morgen" has been included in the hymnal Evangelisches Gesangbuch as EG 334. "Danke" has been called the best-known German sacred song, according to  who analyzed its rhetoric.

See also
Danke Schoen

References

Literature 
 : "Danke für diesen guten Morgen" Zur Rhetorik von Katalog und "enumeratio" im neuen geistlichen Lied. In: Natalie Binczek, Till Dembeck, Alexander Zons (ed.): Dank sagen. Politik, Semantik und Poetik der Verbindlichkeit. Fink, Munich 2013, pp 141–155.

External links 
 "Danke für diesen guten Morgen" (in German) Mitteldeutsche Kirchenzeitungen for the 80th birthday of Schneider, 29 April 2010

20th-century hymns in German
Contemporary Christian songs
1961 songs
Neues Geistliches Lied